Proto-Dené–Caucasian is the reconstructed hypothetical common ancestor of the Dené–Caucasian languages, a proposed language superfamily to which Basque, North Caucasian, Burushaski, Sino-Tibetan, Yeniseian, Na-Dené and possibly also other language families may belong. Dene-Caucasian is not supported by most historical linguists and is generally regarded as a fringe theory.

Reconstructed phonology

As with Proto-Indo-European and Proto-Uralic, linguists working on reconstructions of the Proto-Dené–Caucasian language usually do not use the IPA. To facilitate comparisons with the literature, Starostin's transcription (largely identical to Bengtson's) is used in this section, followed by the IPA equivalents between slashes (for phonemes) or brackets (for actual phones). It differs from the IPA especially in the affricates, each of which is written with a single character, and the laterals. This convention strongly resembles the APA.

As in all reconstructions of proto-languages, every value in the tables below is a hypothesis and may change as more work is done.

Consonants

 ¹ As in today's Caucasian languages, all plosives and affricates (except  and ) were seemingly either voiced, ejective, or aspirated. Because aspiration alone was not phonemic, it is not shown in the phonemic transcription of Proto-Dené–Caucasian, Caucasian languages, or Na-Dené languages in this article.
 ² These sounds were probably not separate phonemes, but allophones of their voiceless counterparts.

Vowels

The reconstruction of vowels is rather tentative. Both long and short vowels are reconstructed, but it is as yet uncertain whether the distinction was phonemic or not. It was, however, crucial for phonological developments in the daughter languages.

The Proto-Dené–Caucasian root

Root structure 
The most basic root structure in Proto-Dené–Caucasian is reconstructed as follows:
Nominal and verbal roots:
 */C1VC2V/
 */C1VC2VC3V/
Verbal and adjectival roots may be preceded by class prefixes and have the following structure (/=/ denotes the position of a class marker):
 */=VC1V/
 */=VC1VC2/
Pronominal roots may be monosyllabic:
 */CV/

Prosodical features 
The evidence from Sino-Tibetan, Yenisian and North Caucasian appears to support the existence of dynamic accent (marked with an acute above the vowel):

 Stress on the penultimate syllable:
 */C1V́C2V/
 */C1VC2V́C3V/
 Stress on the final syllable:
 */C1VC2V́/
 */C1VC2VC3V́/

Regular correspondences

Suprasegmental
The stressed penultimate syllables in PDC give rise to the morpheme-wide tenseness in PNC. As only fricatives and affricates can be tense in PNC, their absence makes tense morphemes indistinguishable from the lax ones. The loss of the slot-3 glottal stop after long vowels in PY is another problem for the clear determination of stress in PDC.
In the following table, P represents a PNC stop consonant, whereas F a fricative or an affricate.

Segmental

Consonants

§1 Stops

Note: Na-Dené languages have three series of stops usually realized as voiceless lenes, aspirated fortes, and ejective fortes, respectively.

Sound correspondences 

The following table depicts how the phonemes of Proto-Dené–Caucasian are hypothesized to have changed into the phonemes of its descendants. Starostin's transcription is used for Proto-Dené–Caucasian, the Basque orthography is used for Basque; IPA is given for all. (Burushaski does not have a fixed orthography.) The Na-Dené correspondences are rather tentative and come exclusively from Bengtson (2008). Hyphens indicate that a phoneme evolved in different ways depending on its position in a word, for example at the beginning or the end. "0" indicates disappearance without a trace. The exact identity of the Proto-Yeniseian phoneme "r₁" is unclear. The derivatives of Proto-Dené–Caucasian consonant clusters are not shown when their constituent phonemes evolved independently.

Note: Na-Dené languages have three series of stops usually realized as voiceless lenes, aspirated fortes, and ejective fortes, respectively.

 ¹ /h/ has disappeared in the southern dialects of Basque in historical times.
 ²  is reconstructed (*) for earlier stages of Basque; it has become /h/ in two northern dialects and disappeared in all others (the remaining northern one and the southern ones).
 ³ Next to /o/ and /u/.
 4 Lengthening of the preceding vowel.
 5 Nasalization of the preceding vowel.
 6 In PNC, the prosodic feature of morpheme-wide tenseness is marked by presence of one or more long (tense) consonants in a morpheme. Starostin also uses a superscript T to mark a tense morpheme and a superscript L to mark a lax one, i.e. PNC *(...)Cː(...) = *(...)C(...)T and *(...)C(...) = *(...)C(...)L.
 7 Or rather, when the stress was on the last syllable and the second consonant was a liquid, the word became /CRV/ instead of the otherwise expected /CVR/.
 8 At the third position of the first (or only) syllable, unless that syllable is long.

Bibliography

BENGTSON, John D., 2004. "Some features of Dene–Caucasian phonology (with special reference to Basque)." In Cahiers de l'Institut de Linguistique de Louvain (CILL): 33–54.
NIKOLA(Y)EV, Sergei L., 1991. "Sino-Caucasian Languages in America." In Shevoroshkin (1991), pp. 42–66.
STAROSTIN, Sergei A., 2004–2005. Sino-Caucasian [comparative phonology] & Sino-Caucasian [comparative glossary].
STAROSTIN, Sergei A., 2000. "Genesis of the Long Vowels in Sino-Tibetan." In Проблемы изучения дальнего родства языков на рубеже третьего тысячелетия: Доклады и тезисы международной конференции РГГУ [Problems of the research on the distant origin of languages at the beginning of the third millennium: Talks and abstracts of the international conference of the RGGU], Moscow 2000.
STAROSTIN, Sergei A., 1996. "Word-final resonants in Sino-Caucasian." Journal of Chinese Linguistics 24.2: 281–311. (written for the 3rd International Conference on Chinese Linguistics in Hongkong in 1994)

 [Translation of Starostin 1984]
 [See Starostin 1991 for English translation]

Dene-Caucasian
Dené–Caucasian languages